Dangerously Delicious is a 2012 American stand-up comedy film written by and starring Aziz Ansari. It was filmed in June 2011, at the Warner Theatre in Washington, D.C. during his Dangerously Delicious Tour.

Synopsis 
The stand-up material included commentary such as Southern culture, racism, wasting time Googling obscure subjects (such as the box office numbers for Home Alone vs Home Alone 2 and Joe Pesci trivia) and online pornography. He also revisited subjects from his previous stand-up special, Intimate Moments for a Sensual Evening, including sharing stories about his young cousin Harris.

Release 
Unlike his previous special, which aired on Comedy Central, Ansari released the special directly on his website for a $5 download. He wrote, "I wanted to release it online because I saw how many people viewed clips from my last special online on sites like YouTube. I also like releasing it myself because there are no commercials, bleeps, or any of that stuff." The download package also included  bonus material such as photos, posters for the Dangerously Delicious Tour, a list of places he ate while on the road, and methods to create a unique own DVD cover.

Nathan Rabin of The A.V. Club commented: "It’s a testament to Ansari’s exploding popularity that, like Louis C.K. and Jim Gaffigan before him, he’s able to cut out once-powerful middlemen like Comedy Central and HBO and release his latest special directly to fans through his website."

Reception 

Dangerously Delicious was well received by critics. Maureen Ryan of The Huffington Post praised Ansari's energetic delivery, writing, "Though Ansari takes on common standup topics — travel, fame, women, etc. — there's a freshness and winning curiosity to his approach: He's honestly amused or annoyed by the things that he's talking about. He's never less than fully engaged by the goofy experiences he's describing, and that keeps the special humming with energy." A reviewer for the comedy website Laugh Button called the special "hilarious" and "another step in the right direction for the comedian as he continues to refine and improve the brand that is Aziz Ansari."

In his review for The A.V. Club, Rabin writes of Ansari's increasing prominence as the comedic voice of his generation.

References

External links

2012 films
American comedy films
Stand-up comedy concert films
Films shot in Washington, D.C.
2012 comedy films
Films directed by Jason Woliner
2010s English-language films
2010s American films